The 1998 Hong Kong Legislative Council election was held on 24 May 1998 for members of the 1st Legislative Council of Hong Kong (LegCo) since the establishment of the Hong Kong Special Administrative Region (HKSAR) in 1997. Replacing the Provisional Legislative Council (PLC) strictly controlled by the Beijing government and boycotted by the pro-democracy camp, the elections returned 20 members from directly elected geographical constituencies, 10 seats from the Election Committee constituency and 30 members from functional constituencies, of which 10 were uncontested.

Taking the advantage of the proportional representation system installed by Beijing, the pro-Beijing party, the Democratic Alliance for the Betterment of Hong Kong (DAB), the weaker side compared to the more developed pro-democratic party, the Democratic Party recorded a clearer increase in the number of seats in the election.

The Democratic Party returned to the Legislative Council as the largest party with 13 seats, while the Association for Democracy and People's Livelihood, a pro-democratic party joined. The Beijing-controlled Provisional Legislative Council lost all its seats.

Electoral method
The electoral method for the first Hong Kong Special Administrative Region was crafted by the Provisional Legislative Council (PLC) installed by the Beijing government during the intense Sino-British confrontation over the democratic reform carried out by the last colonial governor Chris Patten. According to the Hong Kong Basic Law promulgated by Beijing in April 1990, the first legislature would be composed of 60 members, with 20 members returned by geographical constituencies through direct elections, 10 members returned by an election committee and 30 members returned by functional constituencies.

For the geographical constituencies, A proportional representation system was adopted by the SAR government in replacement of the first-past-the-post system introduced in 1995. Under the system Hong Kong was divided into five large districts instead of 20 small ones, with voters in each district choosing three to five persons from candidate lists. It was designed to reward the weaker pro-Beijing candidates and dilute the electoral strength of the majority democrats.

For the functional constituencies, the corporate voting was restored after it was abolished in 1995. It reduced the number of eligible voters by almost 90 percent, from over 1.1 million in 1995 to fewer than 140,000 in 1998. There were also vast disparities in the number of eligible voters among the functional constituencies, ranging from highs of approximately 50,000 in the Education constituency to a few hundred or less in the Agriculture and Fisheries Transport, Insurance, Urban Council and Regional Council constituencies.

For the election committee, the 10 seats would be elected by the 800-member Election Committee, successor to the 400-member Selection Committee which elected the SAR's first Chief Executive in 1996. The committee was predominantly composed of conservative, pro-Beijing business, industrial and professional elites.

Campaign
The proportional representation system induced the contesting parties to practice strategic voting, effectively turning what would have been otherwise a proportional electoral system into single non-transferable vote, to encourage split voting among their supporters. In New Territories East, Martin Lee's Democratic Party reportedly advised its supporters to split their family members' votes between the Democratic Party and its ally The Frontier to help ensure of a third pro-democracy candidate. In Hong Kong Island, the Democratic Party picked a relatively unknown candidate in the third place of its party list, a move reportedly intended to help Christine Loh of the pro-democratic Citizens Party to finish ahead of the second candidate Ip Kwok-him of the rival pro-Beijing Democratic Alliance for the Betterment of Hong Kong (DAB).

Results

Overview

The results saw the pro-democratic camp once again collectively gained over 60 percent of the popular vote, but their share of directly elected seats shrink form 85 percent (17/20) to 65 percent (14/20), due to the new electoral system. The leading pro-Beijing party, the Democratic Alliance for the Betterment of Hong Kong (DAB) which had suffered from the underrepresentation under the single-member plurality system, picked up one seat in each geographical constituency for its 25 percent share of the popular vote. The Association for Democracy and People's Livelihood (ADPL), a pro-democratic party joined the Beijing-controlled Provisional Legislative Council lost all its seats, while two other pro-democratic parties, The Frontier and Citizens Party won 3 and 1 seat respectively.

The pro-business Liberal Party won most seats in the functional constituencies by taking 9 seats in the trade-based sectors, but failed to win any seat in the geographical constituency direct election. Its chairman Allen Lee could not save his seat in New Territories East which he won in the 1995 election. Some 77,813 voters (65 percent of those eligible) cast votes in the 20 functional constituencies while ten others ran uncontested. Reflecting the built-in conservative bias in the majority of the functional constituencies, pro-government parties and their unaffiliated allies dominated the sectors. Due to the pro-Beijing composition of the Election Committee, the pro-Beijing candidates won all 10 seats in the sector.

|-
! style="background-color:#E9E9E9;text-align:center;" rowspan=2 colspan=3|Parties
! style="background-color:#E9E9E9;text-align:right;" colspan=3 |Geographicalconstituencies
! style="background-color:#E9E9E9;text-align:right;" colspan=3 |Functionalconstituencies
! style="background-color:#E9E9E9;text-align:right;" rowspan=2 |ECCseats
! style="background-color:#E9E9E9;text-align:right;" rowspan=2 |Totalseats
|-
! style="background-color:#E9E9E9;text-align:right;" |Votes
! style="background-color:#E9E9E9;text-align:right;" |%
! style="background-color:#E9E9E9;text-align:right;" |Seats
! style="background-color:#E9E9E9;text-align:right;" |Votes
! style="background-color:#E9E9E9;text-align:right;" |%
! style="background-color:#E9E9E9;text-align:right;" |Seats
|-
| rowspan=4 style="text-align:left;background-color:Pink;border-bottom-style:hidden;"|
| width=1px style="background-color: " |
| style="text-align:left;" |Liberal Party 
|50,335
|3.40
|0
|1,316
|1.73
|9
|1
|10
|-
| width=1px style="background-color: " |
| style="text-align:left;" |Democratic Alliance for the Betterment of Hong Kong 
|373,428
|25.23
|5
|293
|0.38
|2
|2
|9
|-
| width=1px style="background-color: " |
| style="text-align:left;" |Hong Kong Progressive Alliance 
|−
|−
|−
|430
|0.56
|2
|3
|5
|-
| width=1px style="background-color: " |
| style="text-align:left;" |Pro-government individuals and others
|25,905
|1.75
|0
|22,442
|29.44
|12
|4
|16
|-style="background-color:Pink"
| style="text-align:left;" colspan=3 |Total for pro-Beijing camp
|449,668
|30.38
|5
|24,481
|32.11
|25
|10
|40
|-
| width=4px rowspan=6 style="text-align:left;background-color:LightGreen;border-bottom-style:hidden;"|
| width=4px style="background-color: " |
| style="text-align:left;" |Democratic Party 
|634,635
|42.87
|9
|48,085
|63.07
|4
|–
|13
|-
| width=1px style="background-color: " |
| style="text-align:left;" |The Frontier 
|148,507
|10.03
|3
|–
|–
|–
|–
|3
|-
| width=1px style="background-color: " |
| style="text-align:left;" |Citizens Party 
|41,633
|2.81
|1
|–
|–
|–
|–
|1
|-
| width=1px style="background-color: " |
| style="text-align:left;" |Hong Kong Association for Democracy and People's Livelihood 
|59,034
|3.99
|0
|0
|0.00
|0
|0
|0
|-
| width=1px style="background-color: " |
| style="text-align:left;" |123 Democratic Alliance 
|3,050
|0.21
|0
|−
|−
|–
|–
|0
|-
| width=1px style="background-color: " |
| style="text-align:left;" |Pro-democracy individuals and others
|95,390
|6.44
|2
|1,889
|2.48
|1
|0
|3
|-style="background-color:LightGreen"
| style="text-align:left;" colspan=3 |Total for pro-democracy camp
|982,249
|66.36
|15
|49,974
|65.55
|5
|0
|20
|-
| style="background-color:"|
| style="text-align:left;" colspan=2 |Individuals and others 
|48,323
|3.26
|0
|1,781
|2.34
|0
|0
|0
|-
|style="text-align:left;background-color:#E9E9E9" colspan="3"|Total
|width="75" style="text-align:right;background-color:#E9E9E9"|1,480,240
|width="30" style="text-align:right;background-color:#E9E9E9"|100.00
|style="text-align:right;background-color:#E9E9E9"|20
|width="75" style="text-align:right;background-color:#E9E9E9"|76,236
|width="30" style="text-align:right;background-color:#E9E9E9"|100.00
|style="text-align:right;background-color:#E9E9E9"|30
|style="text-align:right;background-color:#E9E9E9"|10
|width="30" style="text-align:right;background-color:#E9E9E9"|60 
|-
|style="text-align:left;background-color:#E9E9E9" colspan=11| 
|-
|style="text-align:left;background-color:#E9E9E9" colspan="3"| Valid votes
|width="75" style="text-align:right;background-color:#E9E9E9"| 1,480,240
|width="30" style="text-align:right;background-color:#E9E9E9"| 99.36
|width="30" style="text-align:right;background-color:#E9E9E9" rowspan=4| 
|width="75" style="text-align:right;background-color:#E9E9E9"| 76,236
|width="30" style="text-align:right;background-color:#E9E9E9"| 97.97
|style="text-align:right;background-color:#E9E9E9" colspan="4"|
|-
|style="text-align:left;background-color:#E9E9E9" colspan="3"| Invalid votes
|width="75" style="text-align:right;background-color:#E9E9E9"| 9,465
|width="30" style="text-align:right;background-color:#E9E9E9"| 0.64
|width="75" style="text-align:right;background-color:#E9E9E9"| 1,577
|width="30" style="text-align:right;background-color:#E9E9E9"| 2.13
|style="text-align:right;background-color:#E9E9E9" colspan=4 |
|-
|style="text-align:left;background-color:#E9E9E9" colspan="3"|Vote cast / turnout
|width="75" style="text-align:right;background-color:#E9E9E9"|1,489,705
|width="30" style="text-align:right;background-color:#E9E9E9"|53.29
|width="75" style="text-align:right;background-color:#E9E9E9"|77,813
|width="30" style="text-align:right;background-color:#E9E9E9"|63.50
|style="text-align:right;background-color:#E9E9E9" colspan=4 |
|-
|style="text-align:left;background-color:#E9E9E9" colspan="3"|Registered voters
|width="75" style="text-align:right;background-color:#E9E9E9"|2,795,371
|width="30" style="text-align:right;background-color:#E9E9E9"|100.00
|width="75" style="text-align:right;background-color:#E9E9E9"|122,540
|width="30" style="text-align:right;background-color:#E9E9E9"|100.00
|style="text-align:right;background-color:#E9E9E9" colspan=4 |
|-
| style="text-align:left;" colspan=11 | 10 candidates in 10 functional constituencies were elected unopposed to the Legislative Council.
|} (Total votes added up by this reference)

Vote summary

Seat summary

Result breakdown

Geographical constituencies (20 seats) 
Voting System: Closed party-list proportional representation with the Largest remainder method and Hare Quota.

Functional Constituencies (30 seats)
Voting systems: Different voting systems apply to different functional constituencies, namely for the Heung Yee Kuk, Agriculture and Fisheries, Insurance and Transport, the preferential elimination system of voting; and for the remaining 24 FCs used the first-past-the-post voting system.

Election Committee (10 seats)

Implication
The 1998 election is the first election after the Handover in 1997. Some observers believed the generally free and fair election was crucial for the consolidation of the newly established HKSAR and the political setting of "One Country, Two Systems" after widespread criticism on the PLC.

References

External links
 Official Government election site

 
1998 elections in China
1998 in Hong Kong
Legislative
May 1998 events in Asia